Charles Mitchell was an English professional footballer who played as a centre forward.

Career
Born in Bradford, Mitchell signed for Bradford City in August 1906, having previously played "minor football". He made 2 league appearances for the club. He left the club in 1908 to sign for Rochdale.

Sources

References

Date of birth missing
Date of death missing
English footballers
Bradford City A.F.C. players
Rochdale A.F.C. players
English Football League players
Association football forwards